HMS Uganda was a Second World War-era  light cruiser launched in 1941. She served in the Royal Navy during 1943 and 1944, including operations in the Mediterranean, and was transferred to the Royal Canadian Navy as HMCS Uganda in October 1944. She served in the Pacific theatre in 1945 and was put into reserve in 1947. When she was reactivated for the Korean War in 1952 she was renamed HMCS Quebec.  She was decommissioned for the last time in 1956 and scrapped in Japan in 1961.

Construction and career
HMS Uganda was one of the Ceylon sub-class (the second group of three ships built in 1939) of the Fiji-class cruisers, and built by Vickers-Armstrong at their Walker yard. She was launched on 7 August 1941 and commissioned on 3 January 1943.

Home Fleet operations
In March 1943 after training at Scapa Flow, Uganda sailed as convoy escort to protect a Sierra Leone-bound convoy from the German s operating from the Bay of Biscay. After two such convoy duties, she was sent as escort for the ocean liner  carrying Winston Churchill and his staff to Washington. Upon return from that duty Uganda returned to Plymouth for a refit.

Mediterranean Fleet operations 
With her refit completed, she was sent to the Mediterranean Sea as escort to one of the largest troop convoys of the war heading to Sicily. In July the ship joined the 15th Cruiser Squadron of the Mediterranean Fleet. Uganda was part of the bombardment fleet for Operation Husky, the invasion of Sicily, on 10 July 1943. She was then assigned to close support for major bombardments throughout Sicily. Uganda sailed as part of the support force for Operation Husky from Alexandria along with three cruisers and six destroyers. Uganda was part of Support Force East during the Operation Husky landings. On 10 August, again in support of the Eighth Army, Uganda and the Dutch gunboat  bombarded positions north of Reposto. On 12 August, Uganda, the monitor  and the Dutch gunboats  and  shelled the east coast of Sicily.

On the opening of Operation Avalanche, 9 September 1943, she was part of the fleet bombardment covering the invasion of Italy at Salerno. As part of Operation Avalanche, Uganda was a member of the Northern Attack Force, which landed the British X Corps. The cruiser was a member of the support and escort group for the force. The landings are successful, however the Germans counterattacked and created a serious situation on the beachhead. Uganda was among the ships forced to lie inshore to provide direct naval gunfire support. The fleet then suffered air attacks using FX 1400 radio-controlled and Hs 293 glider bombs. While serving off Salerno at 1440 on 13 September 1943 she took a direct hit from a new German radio controlled 1.4 tonne glide bomb Fritz X dropped by a KG 100 bomber. The Fritz X passed through seven decks and straight through her keel, exploding underwater just under the keel. The concussive shock of the Fritz X's underwater detonation close to Ugandas hull extinguished all her boiler fires, and resulted in sixteen men being killed, with Uganda taking on 1,300 tons of water. Damage control under Lieutenant Leslie Reed managed to get the ship moving with one engine.

There being no dry dock available in the European Theatre that could handle the repairs, Uganda was sent to the US shipyard at Charleston, South Carolina. The heavily damaged ship, with only one of her four propellers working, proceeded across the Atlantic Ocean to Charleston, arriving on 27 November 1943. During the repairs, Uganda had two hangars designed for carrying Supermarine Walrus reconnaissance aircraft removed. These hangars were used for radio and radar equipment as well as crew amenities.

Transfer to Canada

While under repair the Government of Canada negotiated with Britain to obtain Uganda for the Royal Canadian Navy (RCN). The official transfer took place on Trafalgar Day, 21 October 1944 at Charleston and she was renamed HMCS Uganda, out of respect for the British colony. Ugandas first crew in RCN service was notable. The commanding officer was Captain Rollo Mainguy, OBE, who later became chief of the Naval Staff. The first officer (executive officer) was Commander Hugh Pullen, and other officers including Lieutenant Commanders William Landymore and Littler were all eventually promoted to flag rank following the war. Lieutenant John Robarts, Aircraft Recognition Officer, went on to become Premier of Ontario. The other members of her crew of 907 comprised a carefully selected group; additional training on cruisers was provided through personnel exchanges with the RN. The first crew for Uganda was drawn from every province in Canada as well as the Dominion of Newfoundland. Eighty-seven percent were reservists (RCNVR and RCNR) while the balance were regular members of the Royal Canadian Navy.

Ugandas first assignment came shortly after her recommissioning. She was tasked to join the British Pacific Fleet's operational area south of Sakishima Gunto.  She joined the 4th Cruiser Squadron and spent the rest of the month working up. The conditions for the crew were arduous since the ship had not been modified for tropical conditions, which would have provided better air circulation throughout the ship and more fresh water capacity. Uganda left Halifax, Nova Scotia, on 31 October 1944 and steamed via the United Kingdom where following her reconstruction at Charleston, the cruiser underwent further modification. She departed the United Kingdom in January 1945 and sailed to the Pacific, stopping at Gibraltar, Alexandria, Egypt, the Suez Canal, and on via Aden and Colombo, Ceylon, to the fleet base at Fremantle, Australia, where she arrived on 4 March 1945.

As the flagship for the RCN, Uganda served in the Pacific War with the British Pacific Fleet, joining it at Sydney, Australia, in February 1945. Assigned to Task Force 57, British Pacific Fleet, because her radar and aircraft identification capabilities were amongst the best in the fleet, owing to her 1944 refit in Charleston. On 10 April 1945, the strike against Sakishima Gunto was cancelled and the task force was ordered to attack Formosa instead. From 11 to 13 April 1945, Uganda, as part of Task Force 57 in the Pacific, she attacked airfields and installations in northern Formosa, before being redirected back to Sakishima Gunto. The cruiser took part in the bombardment of the Japanese airbases on Sakishima Gunto between 15–20 April before the fleet was tasked to Leyte Gulf. During her time with Task Force 57, Uganda came under kamikaze attack.  She received battle honours for operations during the Battle of Okinawa and was involved in attacking Truk, Formosa and Sakishima Gunto.

In May 1945, Task Force 57 sailed from Leyte to attack Sakishima Gunto for nearly the entire month. Uganda was among the ships ordered to bombard the island group. The task force suffered kamikaze attacks, forcing two of the aircraft carriers to retire and damaging another.

On 4 April 1945, the Canadian government changed the manning policy for all ships deploying to the Pacific theatre. All those heading to the Pacific would have to re-volunteer. Upon volunteering again, the serviceman would be eligible for 30 days leave in Canada before deployment. Controversially this policy change was applied to those already there and Uganda RCN crew were polled by the Canadian government on 7 May 1945 to determine whether they would volunteer for further duties in the Pacific War. Widespread discontent had grown amongst the crew, due to poor living conditions and the lack of a Canadian identity for the ship and the result saw 605 of her crew of 907 refuse to volunteer. The crew of Uganda felt that they had volunteered for "hostilities only" (i.e., hostilities against Nazi Germany), but now found themselves fighting a different enemy in a quite different part of the world.

The vote on 7 May was held onboard Uganda and 605 crew out of 907 refused to volunteer for continuing operations against Japan. The British Admiralty was furious and said it could not replace the ship until 27 July at the earliest. However, the cruiser continued her deployment in the Pacific throughout June and July while the Naval Staff sought an answer to the problem.

Uganda took part in Operation Inmate, a carrier raid on Japanese installations at Truk. Sailing on 12 June from Manus Island, the cruiser was among the ships detailed to bombard the island of Dublon. The force returned to Manus Island on 17 June. In July, Uganda, now part of Task Force 37, sailed to join up with the Americans performing carrier air strikes on the Tokyo area, arriving on 16 July.

HMCS Uganda was detached from the US Navy's Third Fleet on 27 July when Argonaut arrived. Uganda proceeded to Eniwetok, and then to Pearl Harbor for refuelling before heading for Esquimalt. En route to Pearl Harbor, one boiler suffered a liner collapse which would have resulted in the ship's withdrawal from active combat at any rate. Uganda limped into Pearl Harbor on 4 August but was not welcomed because of the resentment that her crew was "quitting" the war. Uganda departed after refuelling and proceeded for Esquimalt. En route to Canada, the crew heard news about the atomic bombs being dropped on Japan. They arrived in Esquimalt on 10 August, the day that Japan announced its acceptance of the Instrument of Surrender.

HMCS Uganda remained on the Pacific coast following the war serving in a training capacity. The cruiser was paid off on 1 August 1947 into the RCN reserve.

Return to service

Canada's entry into the Korean War and commitment of Canadian Army, Royal Canadian Air Force and Royal Canadian Navy units to the British Commonwealth Forces Korea necessitated the reactivation of HMCS Uganda. Beginning in August 1951, the cruiser was refitted and modernized at Esquimalt. The vessel was recommissioned on 14 January 1952 as HMCS Quebec (C31) and moved immediately from Esquimalt to her new station at Halifax to replace units which had departed for Korea. On 14 June 1952, Quebec visited her namesake province for the first time during a port visit to Sorel, Quebec. From 13–25 September, Quebec and the aircraft carrier  participated in the major NATO naval exercise Mainbrace in northern European waters.

On 15 June 1953, HMCS Quebec was the flagship for Rear Admiral Bidwell and led the RCN ships to Spithead for the coronation of Queen Elizabeth II. The Royal Canadian Navy group consisted of an aircraft carrier, two cruisers, one destroyer, and two frigates. In October 1954, Quebec sailed on a seven-week training cruise to the Caribbean Sea and South America, making several port visits. Returning in mid-April 1955, Quebec became the first Canadian naval ship to circumnavigate Africa. As part of a post–Korean War realignment within the navy, HMCS Quebec was paid off on 13 June 1956 and placed in reserve at Sydney, Nova Scotia. The ship was sold in 1960 with the partially dismantled Ontario to Mitsui and Co. of Japan for scrap. The ship was broken up in Japan in 1961.

Her unit name lived on in the form of HMCS Quebec, a cadet summer training centre for the Royal Canadian Sea Cadets. The training centre closed permanently after its summer 2012 operating season.

References

Notes

Bibliography

External links

 WWII cruisers at www.world-war.co.uk
 HMS Uganda at Uboat.net
 The Uganda Episode at Naval and Military Museum 

 

Ships of the Royal Canadian Navy
Cruisers of the Royal Canadian Navy
Ships built on the River Tyne
1941 ships
World War II cruisers of the United Kingdom
Maritime incidents in September 1943
Ships built by Vickers Armstrong